Genilson dos Santos Júnior (born 12 November 1997), commonly known as Espeto, is a Brazilian footballer who currently plays as a defender for Ipojuca.

Career statistics

Club

Notes

References

1997 births
Living people
Brazilian footballers
Association football defenders
Esporte Clube Aracruz players
Linhares Futebol Clube players
Retrô Futebol Clube Brasil players